Ronald James Thom,  (May 15, 1923 – October 29, 1986) was a Canadian architect. He is well known for two works: Massey College and Trent University's riverside campus.

Early years 
He was born in Penticton, British Columbia, the son of James Thom and Elena Myrtle Fennel. Thom served as an aviator with the RCAF during World War II, returned and graduated from the Vancouver School of Art in 1947. He never went to architecture school but apprenticed at Thompson, Berwick & Pratt, where he quickly became recognized as an unusually gifted draughtsman and designer. and also designed notable houses in the Vancouver area, several of which won Massey Awards, the country's top award for architecture. In 1957, he became a registered architect at Thompson, Berwick and Pratt and a partner shortly afterward.

Professional practice 

He established R.J. Thom & Associates in Toronto in 1963 and later the Thom Partnership. He was a Fellow of the Royal Architectural Institute of Canada. In 1980, he was made an Officer of the Order of Canada. He battled alcoholism throughout his life and was eventually forced out of the partnership by some younger partners. He died at his office in 1986 after a bout of heavy drinking. His ashes were taken back by his family and scattered off the Pacific Ocean at Lighthouse Park in West Vancouver.

He was the subject of a major retrospective exhibition in 2013 and 2014, "Ron Thom and the Allied Arts" featuring a collection of photographs, drawings, letters and furniture that he designed for his buildings. The exhibition was shown in British Columbia in 2013, at the Gardiner Museum in Toronto beginning in February 2014, and at the Beaverbrook Gallery, Fredericton in November 2014.

Works

Honours and Awards 

 Fellow, Royal Architectural Institute of Canada
 Member, Royal Canadian Academy of Arts (1973)
 Member, Ontario Association of Architects
 Member, Architectural Institute of British Columbia
 Member, Quebec Association of Architects (1966–1969)
 Honorary Doctorate of Law (LL.D) Trent University 1971
 Honorary Doctorate of Engineering Trent University 1973
 Winner of Design Competition for Massey College, University of Toronto
 Citations of Excellence in Architecture by International College and University Conference and Exposition, 1970
 Toronto Chapter Annual Design Award – 1970
 National Design Council Merit Awards 1971
 Canadian Housing Design Council Award 1971
 Canadian Architect Yearbook Award of Excellence 1974

Personal 

Thom was married twice, first to Christine Helen Millard (1923) in 1943 and survived by second wife Molly (m. 1963), daughter Emma (a veterinarian) and son Adam Thom (himself an architect).

References

External links 

 
 Early photos and letters concerning the development of Trent University
 Ron Thom Slide Show
 Ron Thom's Toronto – Walking Tour, Globe and Mail, January 2014
 List of Globe and Mail articles

1923 births
1986 deaths
Canadian people of Swedish descent
Officers of the Order of Canada
People from Penticton
Trent University
Modernist architecture in Canada
Emily Carr University of Art and Design alumni
20th-century Canadian architects
Royal Canadian Air Force personnel of World War II